Tharia Bakia is an Indian village in Araria district, Bihar.

References

Geography of Bihar